Tiruchengode in South India was a Lok Sabha (House of the People) former constituency in Tamil Nadu state. After delimitation in 2009, it is now a defunct constituency. 

The region covered by this constituency is now a part of the Namakkal constituency.

Assembly segments
Tiruchengode was composed of the following assembly segments:
Kapilamalai (defunct)
Tiruchengode (moved to Namakkal constituency after 2009)
Sankagiri (SC) (moved to Namakkal constituency after 2009)
Edappadi (moved to Salem constituency after 2009)
Modakurichi (moved to Erode constituency after 2009)
Erode (Defunct)

Members of the Parliament

 Seat was decommissioned in 2008

Election results

General Election 2004

General Election 1999

General Election 1998

General Election 1996

General Election 1991

General Election 1989

General Election 1984

General Election 1980

General Election 1977

General Election 1971

General Election 1967

General Election 1962

General Election 1957

General Election 1952

See also
 Tiruchengode
 List of Constituencies of the Lok Sabha

References

External links
 Election Commission of India: https://web.archive.org/web/20081218010942/http://www.eci.gov.in/StatisticalReports/ElectionStatistics.asp

Former Lok Sabha constituencies of Tamil Nadu
Former constituencies of the Lok Sabha
2008 disestablishments in India
Constituencies disestablished in 2008